George A. Mears House is a historic home located at Asheville, Buncombe County, North Carolina. It was built about 1885, and is a -story, brick Queen Anne style dwelling.  It features a number of projecting bass, mansard and garble woofs, and ornamental wraparound verandah.

It was listed on the National Register of Historic Places in 1979.

References

Houses on the National Register of Historic Places in North Carolina
Queen Anne architecture in North Carolina
Houses completed in 1885
Houses in Asheville, North Carolina
National Register of Historic Places in Buncombe County, North Carolina